İlknur Akdoğan (born 2 August 1969) is a Turkish windsurfer. She competed in the 2000 Summer Olympics.

References

1969 births
Living people
Sailors at the 2000 Summer Olympics – Mistral One Design
Turkish female sailors (sport)
Olympic sailors of Turkey
Turkish windsurfers
Female windsurfers